Mount Pleasant is a suburb of Perth, Western Australia, located within Wajuk country, and the City of Melville, on the Canning River. It is bounded by Canning Highway to the north, the Canning River to the east, Cranford Avenue, Moolyeen Road and Canning Avenue to the south, and Rogerson Road, Coomoora Road, Henley Road and Ardross Street to the west.

Mount Pleasant Primary School is located entirely within the boundaries of Mount Pleasant, and Brentwood Primary School abuts Mount Pleasant in the south west of Mount Pleasant just south of Blue Gum Park.

Photos of the suburb

References

External links

Suburbs of Perth, Western Australia
Suburbs in the City of Melville
Canning River (Western Australia)